Yeongcheon is a city in North Gyeongsang Province, South Korea.

It is on the Gyeongbu Expressway linking Seoul and Busan, and is also the junction of the Jungang and Daegu railway lines.

Symbols
City bird: pigeon
City flower: rose
City tree: ginkgo

Economy of Yeongcheon
Yeongcheon is famous for Grape and Wine. It is the largest producer of Grape which has almost 20% of Grape Production in Korea and some of the grapes are exported to United States, Canada and Southeast Asia.

Yeongcheon also has 11 Wineries. The Wineries use Kyoho, Muscat Bailey A, Shine Muscat and Campbell Early Cultivals.

Yeongcheon produces other crops such as Rice, Peach, Apple, Plum, Garlic and others.

Administrative divisions 

Yeongcheon is divided into 1 eup, 10 myeon and 5 dong.

Festivals
The Bohyeon Mountain Starlight Festival takes place in summer and is centered in the Bohyeon Mountain Observatory, which houses the third-largest telescope in Korea. In late summer, the Grape Festival takes place, hosting events such as the Miss Grape contest and a grape-eating competition. Yeongcheon is also well known for its Herbal Medicine Festival, which takes place in October and hosts traditional singing and a variety of herbs which are about 480 Herbal Medicine and Wine which made by Yeongcheon's grapes festival is also famous.

People
Notable individuals born in the city include Goryeo period general Choe Mu-seon and Goryeo intellectual Jeong Mong-ju. Also, it was the hometown of Paek Gun Sang, a tremendous Korean War veteran, who led himself to a high government position without being paid any kind of salary during the Korean War.

Tourism
Tourists to Yeongcheon are few, but popular destinations include Eunhaesa Temple, the War Memorial Park, Cyan Art Gallery, Yeongcheon Dam, the Jeong Sowon and Gatbawi.

Climate

Twin towns – sister cities

Yeongcheon is twinned with:
 Kaifeng, China
 Kuroishi, Japan
 Buffalo, New York, USA

See also
List of cities in South Korea
Yeongcheon River in South Korea

References

External links
City government website

 
Cities in North Gyeongsang Province